Dieter Gonschorek (born 19 September 1944) is a German former cyclist. He competed in the individual road race for East Germany at the 1972 Summer Olympics.

References

External links
 

1944 births
Living people
Sportspeople from Schwerin
People from Mecklenburg
East German male cyclists
Olympic cyclists of East Germany
Cyclists at the 1972 Summer Olympics
Cyclists from Mecklenburg-Western Pomerania
People from Bezirk Schwerin